Länsivuori is a surname. Notable people with the surname include:

Pirkko Länsivuori (1926–2012), Finnish sprinter
Teuvo Länsivuori (born 1945), Finnish motorcycle road racer

Finnish-language surnames